"The After Hours" is the first segment of the twenty-eighth episode of the second season (1986–87) of the revival of The Twilight Zone.

This segment is a remake of The Twilight Zone episode "The After Hours". It differs from the original in that the characters Marsha meets are more menacing, and the tone of the episode is much heavier on suspense. The episode also differs in that rather than remembering what she is and accepting her fate as in the original, Marsha is forced by the other mannequins back into her true form so that another mannequin can take her place.

Plot
A young woman named Marsha travels to the mall after it has closed. A worker takes pity on her and lets her inside. She enters the toy store and tells the clerk she is looking for one of the popular "corn field dolls". A little boy with a toy spider calls Marsha by name. Her mother apologizes for his behavior and denies that he addressed her by name. He begs Marsha to take him with her when she goes. The clerk brings back the doll and Marsha pays for it. She explains that she bought it for her landlord's child, as her landlord found her a job, and let her an apartment even though she was broke. She says the past month has been wonderful. The clerk presses her for details of her life before the past month, pointing out with questioning that she has no memories of that time, no driver's license, not even knowledge of where she came from before she moved to the area.

Unable to answer any of her questions, Marsha runs away. The clerk follows. After boarding the elevator, Marsha discovers a man inside whose hands are amorphous masses with no fingers. Marsha runs out on the ground floor, followed by the lamentations of the mall's mannequins, but cannot get out since the doors are locked and the security guards have gone home. The mannequins find her and inform her that she is a mannequin like them. She refuses to accept this and runs, but is disabled as her appendages gradually turn to plastic. The mannequins tell her she has had her month to be a human and now it's someone else's turn.

The next day, Marsha the mannequin is on display, while a mannequin she ran past the night before moves forward on her way to enjoy her turn as a human.

References

External links
 

The Twilight Zone (1985 TV series season 2) episodes
1986 American television episodes
Television remakes